The Senate Banking Subcommittee on Securities, Insurance, and Investment is one of five subcommittees within the Senate Committee on Banking, Housing, and Urban Affairs.

Jurisdiction
The Subcommittee on Securities, Insurance, and Investment oversees issues related to securities, annuities, and other financial investments. This includes the Securities Exchange Commission, the Securities Investor Protection Corporation (SIPC), and the Commodity Futures Trading Commission. The subcommittee also is responsible for oversight of government-issued securities, financial exchanges and markets, financial derivatives, accounting standards, and insurance.

Members, 118th Congress

Historical subcommittee rosters

117th Congress

Notes and references

External links
U.S. Senate Committee on Banking, Housing, and Urban Affairs
Senate Banking Committee subcommittee list and membership page
 

Banking Securities, Insurance, and Investment